The National House of Chiefs is the highest body in Ghana that unites all traditional rulers, chiefs and kings. The institution has backing from the Constitution of Ghana.

Membership
The various rulers of Ghana's numerous tribes and clans automatically become members of a number of regional houses of chiefs. It is their membership of these regional bodies that qualifies them for membership of the national house.

In addition to these chiefs, a number of queen mothers are also appointed to the national house as associate members. These titleholders are appointed for four-year terms, and are eligible for re-appointment thereafter.

Although the national and regional houses are dominated by citizens of Ghana, they are affiliated with a number of foreign nationals. The African-American religious leader Ra Un Nefer Amen, for example, serves as the U.S. representative of the chiefs in congress assembled. He himself holds a Ghanaian chieftaincy in his own right.

Presidents of NHC
Since the creation of the National House of Chiefs, a president and his vice-president have been selected from among the members of the house to direct their affairs. The practice first started in 1969.

See also
 Chieftaincy institution (Ghana)

References 

Ministries and Agencies of State of Ghana